George Leslie Clarke Rees  (28 December 1905 – 17 August 2000) was an Australian writer for children who was born and raised in Perth, Western Australia.

Career 
He attended Perth Modern School and then the University of Western Australia, where he edited the student magazine, Black Swan.  He then worked for The West Australian as a journalist before travelling to London to study at University College on a scholarship. It was while there that he married fellow Western Australian, Coralie Clarke, who had been a sub-editor during his time on the Black Swan.

Rees returned to Australia in 1936 to become the Australian Broadcasting Commission's first federal drama editor in Sydney.  He was also President of PEN (Sydney) for a number of years.

As a writer, Rees is best known as a prolific author of children's books as well as written travel books, plays and an autobiography.

He wrote the first Australian-written drama to air on Australian television, The Sub-Editor's Room.

He died in Sydney on 17 August 2000.

Selected works

Novel 
 Danger Patrol (1954)

Children's fiction 
 Digit Dick on the Barrier Reef (1942)
 The Story of Shy the Platypus (1944)
 Gecko : The Lizard Who Lost His Tail (1944)
 The Story of Karrawingi the Emu (1946)
 Digit Dick and the Tasmanian Devil (1946)
 The Story of Sarli the Barrier Reef Turtle (1947)
 The Story of Shadow the Rock Wallaby (c.1947)
 The Story of Kurri Kurri the Kookaburra (1948)
 Bluecap and Bimbi : The Blue Wrens (1948)
 Mates of the Kurlalong (1948)
 Quokka Island (1951)
 The Story of Aroora the Red Kangaroo (1952)
 Digit Dick in the Black Swan Land (1952)
 Two Thumbs : The Story of a Koala (1953)
 The Story of Koonawarra the Black Swan (1957)
 Digit Dick and the Lost Opals (1957)
 The Story of Wy-lah the Cockatoo (1959)
 The Story of Russ the Australian Tree Kangaroo (1964)
 Boy Lost of Tropic Coast : Adventure Dexter Hardy (1968)
 The Big Book of Digit Dick (1973)
 Mokee, the White Possum (1973)
 Panic in Cattle Country (1974)
 The Story of Shy the Platypus (1977)
 Here's to Shane (1977)
 Digit Dick and the Magic Jabiru (1981)
 Digit Dick and the Zoo Plot (1982)
 The Seagull Who Liked Cricket (1997)

Drama 
 The Sub-Editor's Room (1937) – and 1956 television adaptation of the same name
 The Man With the Money : A Drama (1948)
 The Harp in the South (1949) – based on the Ruth Park novel of the same title
 Modern Short Plays (1951) edited
 Mask and Microphone : Plays (1963) edited

Travel 
 Spinifex Walkabout : Hitch-hiking in Remote North Australia (1953)
 Westward from Cocos : Indian Ocean Travels (1956)
 Coasts of Cape York : travels around Australia's pearl-tipped peninsula (1960)

Autobiography 
 Hold Fast to Dreams : Fifty Years in Theatre, Radio, Television and Books (1982)

Awards 
 1946 winner Children's Book of the Year Award: Older Readers — The Story of Karrawingi the Emu
1981 appointed Member of the Order of Australia (AM) for service to literature

References

Australian children's writers
1905 births
2000 deaths
Members of the Order of Australia